Nemishaieve (formerly Shevchenkove from 1917–1928)  is an urban-type settlement in Bucha Raion (district) of Kyiv Oblast (province) in northern Ukraine. Nemishaieve hosts the administration of Nemishaieve settlement hromada, one of the hromadas of Ukraine. Its population is 6,178 as of the 2001 Ukrainian Census. Current population: .

Nemishaieve was founded in 1900 as a village, and it retained its village status until it was upgraded to that of an urban-type settlement in 1950. The ruins of the Osten-Saksen estate, which was built in the 19th century, are located in the town.

History
The construction of the Kyiv-Kovel railroad facilitated the construction of a settlement, Nemishaieve, which was founded in September 1900. Nemishaieve is named in honor of the Southwestern Railways Director Klavdiy Nemishaiev, an influential Russian engineer and statesman, who provided  of land for construction of the railway and its workers. Prior to the town's formation, the settlement was a possession of the influential Russian Vorontsov family.

During World War II, local Soviet partisans who fought a guerrilla war against the Axis occupation of the Soviet Union were based in the village. After the war, Nemishaieve was upgraded to that of an urban-type settlement in 1950.

Until 18 July 2020, Nemishaieve belonged to Borodianka Raion. The raion was abolished that day as part of the administrative reform of Ukraine, which reduced the number of raions of Kyiv Oblast to seven. The area of Borodianka Raion was merged into Bucha Raion.

In 2022, a week after the 2022 Russian invasion of Ukraine, Vadym Denysenko, an adviser to the Ukrainian interior minister, said that a battle had taken place between Ukrainian and Russian forces.

People from Nemishaieve
 Yuriy Karakai (1967), Ukrainian politician, People's Deputy of Verkhovna Rada from the Party of Regions.

Gallery

References

Urban-type settlements in Bucha Raion
Populated places established in 1900
Kyiv metropolitan area